George Jacob Jung (August 6, 1942 – May 5, 2021), nicknamed Boston George and El Americano, was an American drug trafficker and smuggler. He was a major figure in the United States cocaine trade during the 1970s and early 1980s. Jung and his partner Carlos Lehder smuggled cocaine into the United States for the Colombian Medellín Cartel. Jung was sentenced to 70 years in prison in 1994 on conspiracy charges, but was released in 2014. Jung was portrayed by Johnny Depp in the biopic Blow (2001).

Early life
George Jung was born on August 6, 1942, in Weymouth, Massachusetts, to Frederick Jung, who owned a small business, and Ermine (née O'Neill) Jung. In high school, Jung was a star football player and was described by his classmates as "a natural leader", but was charged by an undercover police officer for solicitation of prostitution. After graduating in 1961 from Weymouth High School, Jung briefly attended the University of Southern Mississippi, where he considered studying advertising, but dropped out. Jung began recreationally using marijuana and sold a portion of everything he bought to break even.

In 1967, after meeting with a childhood friend, Jung realized the enormous profit potential represented by smuggling the cannabis he bought in California back to New England. Jung initially had his stewardess girlfriend transport the drugs in her suitcases on flights. In search of even greater profits, he expanded his operation to flying the drugs in from Puerto Vallarta, Mexico, using airplanes stolen from private airports on Cape Cod and professional pilots. At the height of this enterprise, Jung and his associates were reportedly making $250,000 a month (equivalent to over $ million in  dollars, adjusting for inflation). This ended in 1974, when Jung was arrested in Chicago for smuggling  of marijuana. He had been staying at the Playboy Club, where he was to meet a connection who would pick up the marijuana. The connection was arrested for heroin smuggling; however, he informed the authorities about Jung to get a reduced sentence. After arguing with the judge about the purpose of sending a man to prison "for crossing an imaginary line with a bunch of plants", Jung was sent to the Federal Correctional Institution, Danbury.

Medellín Cartel
At FCI Danbury in March 1974 during his marijuana trafficking sentence, Jung's cellmate was Carlos Lehder, a young German Colombian man who introduced Jung to the dominant and powerful international drug-trafficking Medellín Cartel; in return, Jung taught Lehder about smuggling. When they were released in 1976, Jung and Lehder smuggled large quantities of cocaine into the United States by joining forces with Pablo Escobar, and they made millions of dollars.

Prison
He later pleaded guilty to three counts of conspiracy and received a 70-year sentence; his sentence was reduced to nearly 20 years after he testified against his ex-partner Carlos Lehder. Jung was incarcerated at Otisville Federal Prison (Medium Security), in Mount Hope, New York, then was transferred to Federal Correctional Institution, Fort Dix (Low Security), New Jersey,  then was transferred to Federal Correctional Institution, La Tuna (Low Security), in Anthony, Texas.

Release and death
Jung was due to be released in November 2014, but was released early, on June 2, 2014, after nearly 20 years. In 2016, he was jailed for a federal supervision violation, then released from a halfway house in 2017.

In September 2014, Jung contributed to the novel Heavy with T. Rafael Cimino, nephew of film director Michael Cimino. Heavy is a fictional story about Jung escaping from a Cuban prison and fleeing to Guatemala.

Jung had been suffering from liver and kidney failure and was receiving hospice care when he died on May 5, 2021, at his Weymouth, Massachusetts home.

Further reading

References

External links
 
 
 
 

1942 births
2021 deaths
Medellín Cartel traffickers
Gangsters from Boston
People from Weymouth, Massachusetts
University of Southern Mississippi alumni
American drug traffickers
American people of German descent
Criminals from Massachusetts
Prisoners and detainees of the United States federal government
Deaths from liver failure
Deaths from kidney failure